KANAL - Centre Pompidou is museum for modern and contemporary art located in Brussels, Belgium, near the Brussels–Charleroi Canal, in the former buildings of a Citroën garage. The definitive opening is scheduled for 2025.

Building 
It was modified in 1954 by Louis Hoebeke.

The building occupies most of the block that is enclosed by the Square Sainctelette/Sainctelettesquare, the Quai des Péniches/Akenkaai, the Quai de la Voire/Ruimingskaai and the Quai de Willebroec/Willebroekkaai. The former showroom, on the corner of the  Square Sainctelette and the place d'Yser/IJzerplein was a single, 21-metre high volume with a glass facade. In the 1950s several floors were added to the showroom

The building is included in the inventory of architectural heritage of the Brussels-Capital Region.

On 28 March 2017 the Urban Development Corporation (SAU-MSI) of the Brussels-Capital Region launched an international design competition for the  €125 million conversion to a museum. The jury selected a proposal, A Stage for Brussels by noAarchitecten, EM2N and Sergison Bates architects.

History 
Plans for a museum by the Brussels–Scheldt Maritime Canal were first proposed in 2014. The government of the Brussels-Capital Region hoped to use works from the Royal Museums of Fine Arts of Belgium, but failed to garner support for using the federal art collection. In March 2015, the government of the Brussels-Capital Region and Groupe PSA reached an agreement for the sale of the site. The sale, for €20.5 million was finalized on 29 October 2015. When the museum was unable to use works from the federal art collection, it partnered with the Centre Pompidou to provide artworks and knowhow. The Centre Pompidou will receive €11 million for 10 years, of which €2 million will be allocated for staff in Paris.

Kanal Brut 
Prior to the renovation and definitive opening in 2023, Kanal pre-opened in May 2018 with an event called Kanal Brut, curated by Bernard Blistène, with works from the collection of the Centre Pompidou and a film studio designed by Michel Gondry. The museum closed for renovations in June 2019.

References 

Museums in Brussels
Art museums and galleries in Belgium
Art museums established in 2017